Frank M. Smith was the winner of the 1906 King's Cup with his yacht Effort.

References

Year of birth missing
Year of death missing
American male sailors (sport)